Live Oak Plantation was originally a small cotton plantation of  located in central Leon County, Florida, United States established by John Branch who arrived in Florida in 1832 and served as Florida Territorial Governor while living at Live Oak for 15 years.

Location
Live Oak was located in north central Leon County extending from the east shore of Lake Jackson to the western edge of Lafayette Township.

1860s

1860 Plantation specifics
The Leon County Florida 1860 Agricultural Census shows that Live Oak Plantation had the following:
 Improved Land: 
 Unimproved Land: 
 Cash value of plantation: $4000
 Cash value of farm implements/machinery: $300
 Cash value of farm animals: $2390
 Number of slaves: 68
 Bushels of corn: 2000
 Bales of cotton: 73

1870s-1900s
On June 9, 1870 John Branch's heirs sold Live Oak, now at only , to Howard S. Case of Columbia, Pennsylvania. This was historically noted as the last large purchase of Leon County plantation property to a northerner.

In 1887 the Case family sold the plantation to Edmund Hugh Ronalds of Edinburgh, Scotland, a chemist and the eldest son of Dr Edmund Ronalds.  Ronalds wintered at Live Oak and married Lisa Williams, daughter of Joseph John Williams of La Grange Plantation on November 21, 1891. In 1892 Lisa Williams Ronalds contracted and died from tuberculosis while in Scotland. Edmund Hugh died on March 17, 1895.

Live Oak Plantation was now larger and its borders extended eastward to Lake Hall, Lake Overstreet, and Lake Elizabeth. 
Dr. Tennent Ronalds, a fellow of the Edinburgh Obstetrical Society, inherited Live Oak upon his brother's death. A keen sportsman, he spent his time enjoying hunting, fishing, and golf.

By 1903 Live Oak boasted a private golf course with a flock of sheep for maintenance of greens and fairways. In 1903 an additional  were leased from Ellen Call Long's Orchard Pond Plantation for use in hunting. In 1915 and 1916 Tennent Ronalds purchased Orchard Pond from the Long and Call families. Ronalds also purchased the James Kirksey Plantation. 
Tennent Ronalds committed suicide on February 24, 1924.

In 1925, Live Oak was only . That year, it was purchased by Herman C. Fleitman of Stamford, Connecticut. In 1934, it was sold again to Leon T. Cheek of Jacksonville, Florida. Cheeks was a member of a well-to-do family from Nashville, Tennessee owning Cheek and Neal Coffee which became Maxwell House.

In 1948, Live Oak was sold to A. M. Middlebrooks. The plantation is no longer, having become the neighborhoods in and around Live Oak Plantation Road and including Middlebrooks Circle.

References

Plantations in Leon County, Florida
Cotton plantations in Florida